Events in the year 1632 in the Spanish Netherlands and Prince-bishopric of Liège (predecessor states of modern Belgium).

Incumbents

Habsburg Netherlands
Monarch – Philip IV, King of Spain and Duke of Brabant, of Luxembourg, etc.

Governor General – Isabella Clara Eugenia, Infanta of Spain

Prince-Bishopric of Liège
Prince-Bishop – Ferdinand of Bavaria

Events
January
 25 January – Gaston of Orleans arrives in Brussels to join Marie de Medici in exile.

March
 Anthony van Dyck leaves for London.

April
 15 April – Johann Tserclaes, Count of Tilly, mortally wounded in the Battle of Rain.

May
 Conspiracy of Nobles: the prince of Barbançon, prince of Espinoy, duke of Bournonville and count of Egmont plot to overthrow Spanish rule in the Southern Netherlands.
 22 May – States General of the United Provinces call upon southern provinces to rise against Spain, promising freedom of worship.

June
 9 June – Siege of Maastricht begins.
 June – Count of Bergh defects to the Dutch.
 25 June ¬– Circular from the Infanta Isabella brands Bergh a traitor.
 30 July – The Infanta summons the Estates General, to meet on 7 September.

August
 22 August – Fall of Maastricht: Brabantine lordship of the city lost to the Dutch Republic; the Prince-Bishop of Liège retains his share in the lordship.
 Dutch raiding parties reach the vicinity of Namur and Mons.

September
 7 September – Estates General convene what will be their last session (dissolved in 1634).
 11 September – Estates General delegate negotiators for peace talks with Dutch.
18 September – Cardinal de la Cueva, Spanish ambassador, leaves Brussels.

October
 3 October – Marquis of Santa Cruz leaves the Low Countries in disgrace.
 10 October – Dutch refuse to treat with delegates of the Estates General.

December
 7 December – Delegates of the Estates General received in The Hague.

Publications
 Jean-Jacques Courvoisier, Extases, de la princesse du Midy, la belle Malceda, au palais du sage roy Salomon (Brussels, Jean Pepermans). Available on Google Books

Births
Date uncertain
 Reynier Covyn, painter (died 1681)
 Hendrik van Minderhout, painter (died 1696)
 Jan Baptist de Wael, painter (died after 1669)
January
  11 January – Adam Frans van der Meulen, painter (died 1690)
July
 26 July – Simon Du Bois, painter (died 1706)

Deaths
Date uncertain
 Ambrosius Francken II, painter
 Somhairle Mac Domhnail (born around 1580), Irish soldier
April
 30 April – Johann Tserclaes, Count of Tilly (born 1559), military commander
June
 21 June – Anselmus de Boodt (born 1550), naturalist
July
 16 July – Conrad III Schetz (born 1553), diplomat
 17 July – Hendrick van Balen (born 1573/75), painter
 19 July – Robert Maudhuy, bookseller
December
 23 December – Crisóstomo Henríquez (born 1594), Cistercian historian

References